The discography of albums and singles released by American country music artist T. G. Sheppard comprises 23 studio albums, six compilation albums, one live album, and 45 singles. Between 1974 and 1991, Sheppard has charted 42 songs on the Billboard Hot Country Songs chart, including 14 that reached number one.

Albums

Studio albums

Compilation albums

Live albums

Singles

As lead artist

As featured artist

Notes

References

Country music discographies
Discographies of American artists